The Maple River is a tributary of the Sheyenne River, about  long, in the Red River Valley of eastern North Dakota in the United States.  Via the Sheyenne River, the Red River of the North, Lake Winnipeg and the Nelson River, the Maple is part of the watershed of Hudson Bay.

Course
The Maple River flows through Steele, Barnes, Cass and Ransom counties. It begins as an intermittent stream near the town of Finley in Steele County, and flows generally southward to Enderlin, where it turns to the northeast and flows past Mapleton.

At Enderlin it collects a short tributary known as the South Branch Maple River, which flows for its entire length in northern Ransom County.

See also 
List of North Dakota rivers

References

Bodies of water of Barnes County, North Dakota
Bodies of water of Cass County, North Dakota
Bodies of water of Ransom County, North Dakota
Rivers of North Dakota
Bodies of water of Steele County, North Dakota
Tributaries of Hudson Bay